The Art of War is a 2000 action spy film directed by Christian Duguay and starring Wesley Snipes, Michael Biehn, Anne Archer and Donald Sutherland. It is the first installment in The Art of War film series.  The film's title refers to the ancient Chinese text of the same name by war strategist Sun Tzu. The film was followed by two direct-to-video sequels, The Art of War II: Betrayal and The Art of War III: Retribution. The latter did not feature Snipes.

Plot
Neil Shaw is an operative for the United Nations's covert SAD, using espionage and quasi-ethical tactics to secure peace and cooperation. In Hong Kong, Shaw infiltrates a Chinese New Year party held by Chinese business mogul David Chan and covertly hacks an office laptop of a North Korean Defense Minister, and blackmails him with the misappropriation of U.N. aid money, in exchange for continuing negotiations with South Korea. Shortly after being discovered, Shaw fights his way out of the party and suffers a gunshot wound to his shoulder during extraction.

Six months later, a shipping container full of dead Vietnamese refugees from Hong Kong turns up on the New York docks on the week as China's trade agreement with the U.S. Shaw's boss, Eleanor Hooks, suspects Chinese ambassador Wu's connection with the Chinese Triad, and assigns Shaw to plant a tracking device on Wu during a banquet held by Chan. During the trade agreement banquet, Wu is gunned down, Chan is shot in the arm, and Shaw pursues a masked gunman. During the pursuit, Shaw's teammate Robert Bly corners the gunman but perishes, and Shaw is arrested by the NYPD. In the middle of a prison transfer, FBI agent Frank Capella's van is disabled by a roadside bomb, and an unconscious Shaw is captured by Triad members to be framed for the murder and disposed of. Shaw regains consciousness and frees himself from captivity, only to find his last remaining team member, Jenna Novak, murdered by a Chinese hitman. Shaw kills the hitman, recovers the audio file, and secures weapons and equipment from Novak's hidden armory.  Shaw seeks out Julia Fang's help after reading a news article stating Shaw's innocence. Shaw manages to save Fang from an ambush by a Chinese hitwoman at a hospital.

With Fang's aid, Shaw finds a Triad-owned bakery serving as a front for a Gentleman's club, setting up an unlikely alliance with Capella, as well as retrieving video footage of Chan's role in derailing the trade agreement.  Fang delivers the evidence to Hooks while Shaw confronts Chan at the same hotel serving as the banquet. Chan is shot dead by a masked gunman while being interrogated by Shaw. The pursuit ends when Shaw finds a scanner that is tuned to a tracking device embedded in Shaw's gunshot wound before being ambushed by Bly. Bly reveals himself as the assassin at the banquet, and also engineered the tracking device implant from an earlier basketball game injury. Hooks reviews the evidence and reveals that she and Chan were the masterminds behind the conspiracy. A disgusted Fang tries to leave but attempts to hide from Bly only to be locked in a bathroom.

Shaw eventually figures out Hooks's role behind the conspiracy and approaches Capella with his findings. Shaw surgically removes his tracking device and uses Capella's business card to give the Triads a business proposition. Shaw breaks into the U.N. building and enters into a shootout and hand-to-hand fight with Bly, where the latter dies after falling on a shard from a broken glass pane. The following day, Shaw calls Hooks in her limousine and lectures her on a lesson in karma, revealing that Shaw's business proposition to the Triads was to assassinate Hooks for her betrayal. Shaw later has his death faked before reuniting with Fang in France but is monitored by an unknown spy.

Cast

 Wesley Snipes as SAD Agent Neil Shaw
 Donald Sutherland as UN Secretary-General Douglas Thomas
 Maury Chaykin as FBI Agent Frank Capella
 Anne Archer as Eleanor Hooks
 Marie Matiko as Julia Fang
 Ron Yuan as Ming
 Michael Biehn as SAD Agent Robert Bly
 Cary-Hiroyuki Tagawa as David Chan
 Liliana Komorowska as SAD Agent Jenna Novak
 James Hong as Ambassador Wu
 Paul Hopkins as FBI Agent Ray
 Glen Chin as Defense Minister General Ochai
 Bonnie Mak as Anna Li
 Uni Park as Tina Chan
 Fernando Chien as Zeng Zi
 Paul Wu as "Shades"
 Noel Burton as Alex Wingate
 Mike Tsar as NYPD Lieutenant 
 Steven P. Park as "Tattoo"

Jet Li was originally cast for the part but was eventually played by Wesley Snipes. TV reporter Erin Selby appears as a reporter.

Reception

Box office
The film opened at #2 behind Bring It On, earning $10,410,993 in its opening weekend in the United States. The Art of War went on to gross $40.4 million worldwide, failing to bring back its $60 million budget.

Critical response
Rotten Tomatoes, a review aggregator, reports that 16% of 80 surveyed critics gave the film a positive review; the average rating is 3.9/10. The site's consensus says: "Excessively noisy and overly reliant on genre clichés, The Art of War wastes its star's charisma on a ridiculous, convoluted plot and poorly edited action sequences". Metacritic rated it a generally unfavorable 30/100 based on 23 reviews. Emanuel Levy of Variety wrote: "Despite some effectively rousing set pieces, particularly in the long corridors of the U.N. building, The Art of War is ultimately much less than the sum of its parts". Stephen Holden of The New York Times called it "ludicrous, impenetrable and headache-inducing".

Sequels

Wesley Snipes reprised his role as Neil Shaw in a straight-to-DVD sequel released in August 2008. Athena Karkanis and Lochlyn Munro also star in the film. In the sequel, Agent Neil Shaw is called out of retirement as a Hollywood film consultant by the murder of his long-time martial arts mentor, "Broodmother".

The third and final film in the series stars Anthony "Treach" Criss, Sung-Hi Lee, Warren Derosa and David Basila, but neither Snipes nor any of his co-stars from the first two films.

References

External links
 
 
 

2000 films
2000 martial arts films
2000s political films
2000s spy action films
American spy action films
American martial arts films
American political thriller films
Canadian action films
2000s English-language films
Films about the Federal Bureau of Investigation
Films about the United Nations
Films directed by Christian Duguay (director)
Films scored by Normand Corbeil
Films set in Hong Kong
Films set in New York City
Films shot in Montreal
Franchise Pictures films
Morgan Creek Productions films
The Art of War films
Triad films
Warner Bros. films
2000s American films
2000s Canadian films
2000s Hong Kong films